The 1932 United States Senate election in Illinois took place on November 8, 1932. Incumbent Republican Otis F. Glenn was unseated by Democrat William H. Dieterich.

Election information
The primaries and general election coincided with those for federal elections (president and House) and those for state elections. Primaries were held April 12, 1932.

Background
The economic downturn that was the Great Depression was raging through the nation since the 1929 Wall Street crash. Many voters laid blame for the downturn and its impacts on Republican president Herbert Hoover.

The 1930 election for Illinois' other U.S. Senate seat saw the first instance after the Seventeenth Amendment to the United States Constitution (adopted in 1912) went into effect (instituting popular elections for U.S. senate) that a Republican lost a U.S. Senate race in Illinois, with Democrat J. Hamilton Lewis winning that election.

Democratic primary

Candidates
Thomas A. Cummings
William H. Dieterich, U.S. congressman
Clarence H. Kavanaugh
Emmet Kennedy
Scott W. Lucas, former Mason County state's attorney
John B. Monroe
Thomas F. O'Donnell
Edward Sullivan
William Young

Results

Republican primary

Candidates
Otis F. Glenn, incumbent U.S. senator
Newton Jenkins, candidate for U.S. Senate in 1924 and 1930
T.B. Wright

Results

General election

See also
1932 United States Senate elections

References

1932
Illinois
United States Senate